Avano Atho Avalo is a 1979 Indian Malayalam film,  directed by Baby and Kashinath. The film stars Jayan, KP Ummer, Jagathy Sreekumar, Jose and Jose Prakash in the lead roles. The film has musical score by M. K. Arjunan. The film was a remake of the Kannada film Aparichita.

Plot
Shashi, the son of an estate owner, goes missing one morning, and the subsequent police investigation unearths some unpleasant family secrets and hidden agendas.

Cast

Jayan as Prakash
K. P. Ummer as Mohan
Jose Prakash as Surendran
Jagathy Sreekumar as Velappan
Vadivukkarasi as Gawri
Prathapachandran as Narayanan
Kanakadurga as Sharada
 Sathaar
 Ashokan
 Jose
 Sudeer
 John Varghees
 Vasanthan
 Vanchiyoor Radha as Janaki Amma, Gawri's mother
 Gowri
 Jaya Gowri

Soundtrack
The music was composed by M. K. Arjunan and the lyrics were written by Bichu Thirumala.

References

External links
 

1979 films
1970s Malayalam-language films
Indian thriller films
Malayalam remakes of Kannada films
1970s thriller films
Films directed by Baby (director)